is a railway station in Kashihara, Nara Prefecture, Japan.

Line
Kintetsu Railway
Osaka Line

Layout
This station has two side platforms a track each.

Surround
 Mount Mininashi (A part of Yamato Sanzan)

Adjacent stations

Railway stations in Japan opened in 1929
Railway stations in Nara Prefecture